Thomas Kaboré (born 23 September 1943 in Ouagadougou) is a Burkinabe clergyman and bishop for the Roman Catholic Diocese of Kaya. He was ordained in 1970 and appointed bishop in 1999. He retired in 2018.

References

21st-century Roman Catholic bishops in Burkina Faso
People from Ouagadougou
1943 births
Living people
Roman Catholic bishops of Kaya